Keeshan may refer to:

Bob Keeshan, an American television producer and actor
Keeshan is an anglicization of the Nuu-chah-nulth name Kiix?in, an ancient fortress which is a National Historic Site of Canada, also used in the name of Keeshan Indian Reserve No. 9 or Keeshan 9, an Indian Reserve of the Huy-aa-aht First Nation, which includes the site